Buffalo riot may refer to:

 Buffalo riot of 1862, an immigrant workers strike at Buffalo, New York
 Buffalo riot of 1967, a race riot at Buffalo, New York